General elections were held in Denmark on 15 February 1977. The Social Democratic Party remained the largest in the Folketing, with 65 of the 179 seats. Voter turnout was 89% in Denmark proper, 63% in the Faroe Islands and 70% in Greenland.

Results

References

Elections in Denmark
Danish general election
General election
Danish general election